{{speciesbox
|name = Silky parrot-pea
|image = Dillwynia uncinata.jpg
|image_caption = Dillwynia uncinata in Ferries McDonald Conservation Park
|genus = Dillwynia
|species = uncinata
|status_system = 
|status = 
|authority = (Turcz.) J.M.Black
|synonyms_ref = 
|synonyms = 
 Dillwynia patula (F.Muell. ex D.Dietr.) F.Muell. 
 Eutaxia patula F.Muell. ex D.Dietr. 
 Eutaxia sparsifolia F.Muell. 
 Eutaxia sparsifolia F.Muell. isonym
 Eutaxia uncinata Turcz. 
}}Dillwynia uncinata, commonly known as silky parrot-pea, is a species of flowering plant in the family Fabaceae and is endemic to southern Australia. It is an erect, spreading shrub with cylindrical leaves and yellow flowers with a red centre.

The wings are slightly shorter and the keel shortest and reddish. Flowering occurs from September to November.

Taxonomy and naming
This species was first formally described in 1853 by Nikolai Turczaninow in Bulletin de la Société impériale des naturalistes de Moscou and was given the name Eutaxia uncinata. In 1916, John McConnell Black changed the name to Dillwynia uncinata in the Transactions and Proceedings of the Royal Society of South Australia. The specific epithet (uncinata) means "hooked" or "barbed", referring to the leaves.

Distribution
This dillwynia grows in heath, on dunes and in swampy areas in the south-west of Western Australia, in south-eastern South Australia and in the north-west of Victoria.

Conservation statusDillwynia uncinata'' is classified as "not threatened" by the Government of Western Australia Department of Parks and Wildlife.

References

uncinata
Eudicots of Western Australia
Flora of South Australia
Flora of Victoria (Australia)
Taxa named by Nikolai Turczaninow
Plants described in 1853